A silver screen, also known as a silver lenticular screen, is a type of projection screen that was popular in the early years of the motion picture industry and passed into popular usage as a metonym for the cinema industry. The term silver screen comes from the actual silver (or similarly reflective aluminium) content embedded in the material that made up the screen's highly reflective surface. 

Invented by Akron, Ohio projectionist Harry Coulter Williams, the "Williams Perlite" was an all-purpose, tear-resistant, vinyl plastic indoor motion picture screen that was installed in all the major movie houses of the day, including the rapidly expanding theaters built by Warner Bros of nearby Youngstown, Ohio.  Williams' unique silver-painted screens were adapted for CinemaScope, VistaVision, and later 3-D movies. They provided a brighter picture at all angles with top reflectivity at direct viewing and extra diffusion for side seats and balconies. 

Metallic screens increased in popularity during the 3-D film boom that occurred in the 2000s to 2010s.

Characteristics

Silver lenticular (vertically ridged) screens, which are made from a tightly woven fabric, either natural, such as silk, or a synthetic fiber, were excellent for use with low-power projector lamp heads and the monochromatic images that were a staple of early projected images.  Other silver screens are made by taking normal matte sheets and adhering silver dust to them; the effect is the same.

True silver screens, however, provide narrower horizontal/vertical viewing angles compared to their more modern counterparts because of their inability to completely disperse light.  In addition, a single projection source tends to over-saturate the center of the screen and leave the peripheries darker, depending on the position of the viewer and how well adjusted the lamp head is, a phenomenon known as hot-spotting.  Due to these limitations and the continued innovation of screen materials, the use of silver screens in the general motion picture exhibition industry has mostly been phased out.

Use in 3-D projection

Silver lenticular screens, while no longer employed as the standard for motion picture projection, have come back into use as they are ideally suited for modern polarized 3-D projection. The percentage of light reflected from a non-metallic (dielectric) surface varies strongly with the direction of polarization and the angle of incidence; this is not the case for an electric conductor such as a metal  (as an illustration of this, sunlight reflected from a horizontal surface such as a reflective road surface or water is attenuated by polarized sunglasses relative to direct light; this is not the case if the light is reflected from a metallic surface). As many 3-D technologies in use today depend upon maintaining the polarization of the images to be presented to each eye, the reflecting surface needs to be metallic rather than dielectric.

Additionally, the nature of polarized 3-D projection requires the use of interposed filters, and the overall image is consequently less bright than if it were being normally projected.  Silver lenticular screens help compensate by reflecting more light back than a "modern" screen would—the same purpose they originally served in the early days of motion pictures.

Other screen types

Each of these screen types continues to enjoy widespread popularity for both home and business applications:

 Aluminized screen
Similar to a silver screen, but using aluminium to coat the surface. Used for 3-D films for the same reason as silver screens.
 Pearlescent screen
Similar to a silver screen, this screen has narrow viewing angles and a higher gain (the measure of reflected light), but it does suffer from color-shifts to red and a tendency to hot spot.
 Glass-beaded screen
This screen type also has a higher gain; however, the nature of its construction results in limited viewing angles and a loss of resolution since glass-beaded screens are retro-reflective, that is, their reflection is directed back toward the light source. The glass-beaded surface can develop noticeable dark spots with age or mishandling as the beads can wear off. It is popular in the amateur market.
 Gray screen
Also known as a high contrast screen, because its purpose is to boost contrast on projectors in viewing rooms that are not entirely dark, as the gray screen absorbs ambient light that strikes it better than a white screen does. Essentially, the screen only reflects the specific shades of red, green, and blue output by a trichromatic video projector, and absorbs the remainder. Therefore, the projected image is reflected normally, but other light is not. In doing so, the black level on the screen is maintained. Mostly used with digital projectors in non-commercial settings.
 Matte white screen
This screen provides the widest viewing angles while producing no glare and no hot spotting. These characteristics have made it the most common variety of screen currently produced and has allowed it to become the entertainment industry's standard.

References 

Film and video technology